Les Halles is a station on Line 4 of the Paris Métro. Located in the 1st arrondissement, it takes its name from the market halls which were on the site for many years.

Location

Established underground, Les Halles station is located on Line 4 of the Paris Métro, under the westfield Forum des Halles shopping complex between Rue Rambuteau and Rue Berger.

Corridors and underground staircases connect it to Châtelet Métro station and to Châtelet–Les Halles RER station.

History
The original station on 21 April 1908 as part of the first section of the line from Châtelet to Porte de Clignancourt to serve Les Halles (old markets). The station was rebuilt and put into service on 3 October 1977 about ten metres further east to interchange with the new Châtelet–Les Halles RER station on RER A, RER B and RER D which opened on 9 December 1977. This RER station is connected by underground corridors to the Métro station Châtelet on Line 1, Line 4, Line 7, Line 11 and Line 14; Les Halles is therefore also connected with Châtelet. Line 4 is the only line that serves Les Halles; it also serves Châtelet station.

Les Halles serves the underground shopping centre Forum des Halles. One of the floors of the Forum des Halles contains the Métro station. As part of the automation of Line 4, its platforms were upgraded during the weekend of 10 and 11 June 2017, in order to receive landing doors. These are installed between the end of January and mid-February 2020.

In 2019, 16,069,170 users entered the station which placed it in ninth position among stations in the Paris metropolitan network (out of 302).

Passenger services

Access
The station is accessible by an entrance to no. 230 Rue Rambuteau and by connecting corridors with Châtelet–Les Halles. It has an information area with a members counter and is equipped with automatic ticketing machines.

Station layout

Platforms
Les Halles is a standard configuration station. It has two platforms separated by metro tracks and an open load-bearing wall.

Other train connections
It allows connections with RER A, B and D of the commuter rail network via the platforms of Châtelet–Les Halles station, as well as to Line 1, Line 7, Line 11 and Line 14 of the Paris Métro at Châtelet accessed via the RER station, through pedestrian corridors.

The station, in the heart of a pedestrian area, is not served by any bus lines.

See also
Châtelet (Paris Métro)
Châtelet–Les Halles

References

Roland, Gérard (2003). Stations de métro. D'Abbesses à Wagram. Éditions Bonneton.

Paris Métro stations in the 1st arrondissement of Paris
Railway stations in France opened in 1908
Railway stations in France opened in 1977